Navarana Fjord is a fjord in Peary Land, far northern Greenland. It is named after an Inuit woman.

In 1984 important zinc and barium deposits were discovered in the Navarana Fjord. Australian Ironbark Zinc corporation was granted an exploration licence in 2007.

History
This fjord was mapped by Danish Arctic explorer Eigil Knuth during the Danish Peary Land Expedition of 1947–1950. It was named after Navarana Mequpaluk (died 1921), the wife of Arctic explorer Peter Freuchen (1886–1957). Navarana had died at Upernavik in 1921 just before joining the Fifth Thule Expedition with her husband. Her death came at the time of the influenza epidemic that ravaged indigenous populations in Greenland in the early 1920s.

Geography
Navarana Fjord is located in the northeastern part of Freuchen Land, western Peary Land. The fjord runs roughly southwards in the middle fjord zone, deeply dividing the Freuchen Land Peninsula.

There is a fairly large glacier, the Navarana Fjord Glacier, at the head of the fjord discharging from the southeast.

Geology
Geologically this fjord is located in the Paleozoic Franklinian Basin. Navarana Fjord is part of an escarpment at the northern edge of a Silurian limestone shelf with a fault running for  reaching Nyeboe Land.

Sisamatispongia is a genus of fossil sponges whose spicules are only recorded from Navarana Fjord.

Bibliography
H.P. Trettin (ed.), Geology of the Innuitian Orogen and Arctic Platform of Canada and Greenland. 1991

See also
List of fjords of Greenland
List of geographic features in Greenland named after Greenlandic Inuit

References

External links
Ironbark set to open a new zinc basin for hungry smelters
Navarana Fjord area, Northeast Greenland National Park, Greenland, Denmark
Fibroferrite from Navarana Fjord area, Northeast Greenland National Park, Greenland, Denmark
The Navarana Fjord Member: an Upper Llandovery platform derived carbonate conglomerate.

Fjords of Greenland
Peary Land